Gilliard's flying fox (Pteropus gilliardorum) is a species of flying fox in the family Pteropodidae. In Spanish, the common name is zorro volador de Gilliard. It is endemic to Papua New Guinea. It is known from only three specimens.

Biology
Their natural habitats are subtropical or tropical dry forests and subtropical or tropical swamps. They prefer to stay solitary or in small groups. They live in a restricted range, and widespread clearing of lowland forests could affect upland habitats.

References

Pteropus
Bats of Oceania
Endemic fauna of Papua New Guinea
Mammals of Papua New Guinea
Mammals described in 1969
Taxonomy articles created by Polbot
Bats of New Guinea